Vice Admiral Sir Peveril Barton Reiby Wallop William-Powlett,  (5 March 1898 – 10 November 1985) was a Royal Navy officer who served as Commander-in-Chief, South Atlantic Station from 1952 to 1954.

Naval career
William-Powlett attended Cordwalles School. He joined the Royal Navy as a midshipman in 1914 and served in the First World War, specialising in signals. A keen sportsman, he played rugby for England in 1922. He saw service with the New Zealand Division from 1931 to 1936 and then commanded the cadet training ship  in 1939.

In 1935, William-Powlett was awarded the King George V Silver Jubilee Medal.

William-Powlett served in the Second World War as Director of Manning at the Admiralty and then commanded the cruiser , which was sunk during the Battle of Crete in 1941. He was appointed Chief of Staff of Force H at Gibraltar in 1941 and then commanded  from 1942. He became Captain of the Fleet in the Home Fleet in 1944.

After the war, William-Powlett commanded the Royal Naval College, Dartmouth and then became Naval Secretary in 1948. He went on to be Flag Officer (Destroyers) in the Mediterranean Fleet in 1950 and Commander-in-Chief, South Atlantic in 1952. He retired in 1954.

In retirement William-Powlett served as Governor of Southern Rhodesia from 1954 until 1959.

Family
In 1923, William-Powlett married Helen Constance Crombie; they had three daughters. Following the death of his first wife he married Barbara Patience William-Powlett, widow of his brother, in 1966.

William-Powlett's second daughter, Helen, married Henry Bruce of Salloch, and is the mother of the royal commentator Alastair Bruce of Crionaich.

References

|-

|-
 

1898 births
1985 deaths
Military personnel from Monmouthshire
Royal Navy vice admirals
Knights Commander of the Order of the Bath
Knights Commander of the Order of St Michael and St George
Commanders of the Order of the British Empire
Companions of the Distinguished Service Order
English rugby union players
England international rugby union players
High Sheriffs of Devon
Rugby union players from Abergavenny
Rugby union props